Natalie Marie Spilger (born May 19, 1982) is a retired American soccer defender.  Spilger is a former member of the United States U-21 women's national soccer team.

Spilger is also the CEO and founder of GreenLaces, an international organization that activates the global athletic community to improve our environment by inspiring personal action, connecting a community and educating fans.

References

External links
 Chicago Red Stars player profile
 Stanford player profile
 GreenLaces Website
 Natalie Spilger, one of Chicago magazine's Top Singles of 2010

1982 births
Living people
American women's soccer players
Chicago Red Stars players
Stanford Cardinal women's soccer players
Sportspeople from El Cajon, California
Bälinge IF players
Damallsvenskan players
Expatriate women's footballers in Sweden
American expatriate women's soccer players
American expatriate sportspeople in Sweden
Women's association football defenders
California Storm players
Women's Premier Soccer League players
Women's Professional Soccer players